Sierra class may refer to the following:

Sierra-class submarine, a Soviet/Russian Navy submarine class
, a Mexican Navy corvette class